Cathedral of St. James or St. James Cathedral may refer to:

Austria
 Innsbruck Cathedral (Dom zu St. Jakob)

Australia
 St James' Cathedral, Townsville, Queensland

Canada
 Cathedral Church of St. James (Toronto)
 Saint-Jacques Cathedral (Montreal), mostly demolished
 Mary, Queen of the World Cathedral in Montreal, originally known as Saint James Cathedral
 St. James' Cathedral (Peace River), Alberta

Chile
 St. James Cathedral, Valparaíso

Croatia
 Šibenik Cathedral of St James

Israel
 Cathedral of St. James, Jerusalem

Latvia
 St. James's Cathedral, Riga

Panama
 St. James the Apostle Cathedral, Santiago de Veraguas

Philippines
 Cathedral of Saint James the Elder (Bangued)

Poland
 Cathedral Basilica of St. James the Apostle, Szczecin

Portugal
 Cathedral of St. James the Great, Beja

Puerto Rico
 Catedral Santiago Apostol (Fajardo, Puerto Rico), listed on the NRHP in Puerto Rico

Spain
 St. James' Cathedral, Bilbao
 Santiago de Compostela Cathedral

United States
 St. James Cathedral (Chicago)
 Cathedral Basilica of St. James (Brooklyn)
 St. James Cathedral (Orlando, Florida)
 Cathedral of St. James (South Bend, Indiana), listed on the National Register of Historic Places
 St. James Cathedral (Seattle) 
 Proto-Cathedral of St. James the Greater (Vancouver, Washington, United States), known as St. James Cathedral from 1851 to 1907

See also
 St. James' Church (disambiguation)